Vostretsovo is a rural locality (a selo) and the administrative centre of Vostretsovsky Selsoviet, Burayevsky District, Bashkortostan, Russia. The population was 330 as of 2010. There are 8 streets. It is named after the Soviet military commander Stepan Vostretsov.

Geography 
Vostretsovo is located on the right bank of the Belaya River, 32 km southwest of Burayevo (the district's administrative centre) by road. Kreshchenka is the nearest rural locality.

References 

Rural localities in Burayevsky District